George Horton (1859–1942) was a U.S. diplomat.

George Horton may also refer to:
George Horton (baseball) (born 1953), head coach of the Oregon Ducks baseball team
George Moses Horton (1778–1883), African-American poet
George E. Horton (1910–?), Canadian politician in the Legislative Assembly of New Brunswick
George Henry Horton (born 1993), British filmmaker
George Vaughn Horton (1911-1988), American songwriter